Pecker is a 1998 American comedy film written and directed by John Waters. Like all of Waters' films, it was filmed and set in Baltimore; this film was set in the Hampden neighborhood.

The film examines the rise to fame and potential fortune of a budding photographer, played by Edward Furlong. Co-starring Christina Ricci, Lili Taylor, Mary Kay Place, Martha Plimpton, Brendan Sexton III, and Bess Armstrong.  The film received mixed reviews from critics, but grossed about $2.3 million in the United States box office and was able to make profit.

Plot
In a Baltimore neighborhood known for having the thickest local accent, unassuming 18-year-old Pecker works in a sandwich shop and takes photos of his loving but peculiar family and friends on the side. Pecker, named for his childhood habit of "pecking" at his food, becomes unexpectedly popular when savvy New York art dealer Rorey Wheeler "discovers" his work. Pecker's pictures, taken with a cheap Canon Canonet 28, are grainy, out-of-focus studies of unglamorous subjects, but they strike a chord with New York art collectors.

Unfortunately, Pecker discovers that instant over-exposure has its downsides. Rorey's efforts to turn Pecker into an art sensation threaten to ruin the low-key lifestyle that inspired him. He abandons his trusty old rangefinder camera for a new, full-featured Nikon N50. Pecker finds that his best friend, Matt, can't shoplift anymore because Pecker's photographs have increased his visibility. Shelley, Pecker's obsessive girlfriend who runs a laundromat, seems especially distressed when the press dub her a "stain goddess", mistaking her good-natured "pin-up" poses for pornographic come-ons. 	

When an overzealous critic dubs Pecker's family "culturally challenged", they begin to feel the uncomfortable glare of stardom. His mother Joyce can no longer freely dispense fashion tips to the homeless clientele at her thrift shop; his grandmother, Memama, endures public ridicule when her experience with a talking statue of the Virgin Mary is exposed on the cover of a national art magazine, and his older sister Tina is fired from her job emceeing go-go dancing at a gay bar because Pecker's edgy photographs chronicle the sex practices of the club's patrons. Even Little Chrissy, his six-year-old sister, feels the pressure of celebrity when her eating disorder is exposed, bringing unwanted attention from nosy child welfare agencies, and she is mistakenly diagnosed with Attention-Deficit Hyperactivity Disorder and prescribed Ritalin.

Having seen his new-found fame disrupt the lives of his family and friends, Pecker upsets the art world by refusing to participate in a scheduled show at the Whitney Museum of Art. Instead, he forces New York art collectors to come to Baltimore to see his latest photographs, which insultingly portray the same people who disparaged his family, with one photo showing Lynn Wentworth adjusting her breasts in a mirror.

Asked what he plans to do next, Pecker replies that he would like to direct a film.

Cast

Reception
On Rotten Tomatoes, the film has an approval rating of 52%, based on 46 reviews, with an average rating of 5.9/10. On Metacritic, it has a score of 66 out of 100, based on 24 reviews, indicating "generally favorable reviews".

Describing it as "John Waters' first stab at making a mainstream movie," Edvins Beitiks' review in The San Francisco Examiner said it "starts out well and winds up no worse than most of the stuff that comes out of Hollywood". In his review for the Chicago Sun-Times, Roger Ebert noted a "tension between the gentler new Waters and his anarchic past. In the scenes in the male strip bar, for example, we keep waiting for Waters to break loose and shock us, and he never does, except with a few awkward language choices. The miraculous statue of Mary could have provided comic possibilities, but doesn't."
Peter Stack of the San Francisco Chronicle wrote that Pecker is "never truly funny, but it's an amusing novelty, gaining strength from smart characterizations and sly cogency about the way people are exploited under the limelight of celebrity."

Soundtrack
The soundtrack was released on September 29, 1998 by New Line Records.

 "Happy-Go-Lucky Me" – Paul Evans
 "The Love Chase" – Stewart Copeland
 "I'm a Nut" – Leroy Pullins
 "Memama" – Stewart Copeland
 "Uh! Oh! (Part 1)" – The Nutty Squirrels
 "Straight Boys" – Vicky Randle and Stewart Copeland
 "I'm Gonna Sit Right Down and Write Myself a Letter" – Billy Williams
 "In the Mood" – Henhouse Five Plus Too (Ray Stevens)
 "Back to Hampden/Sneaky Shelly" – Stewart Copeland
 "Baltimore, You're Home to Me" – Dave Hardin
 "Thrift Shop Fashion Shoot" – Stewart Copeland
 "Don't Drop the Soap (For Anyone Else But Me)" – Stan Ridgway and Stewart Copeland
 "New York Montage" – Stewart Copeland
 "Swamp Thing" – The Grid
 "Woo-Hoo" – The Rock-A-Teens

References

External links
 
 
 
 

1998 films
1998 comedy-drama films
1998 LGBT-related films
American comedy-drama films
American LGBT-related films
American satirical films
1990s English-language films
Films directed by John Waters
Films about dysfunctional families
Films set in Baltimore
Films shot in Baltimore
American independent films
1998 independent films
Lesbian-related films
Films about photographers
LGBT-related comedy-drama films
Films scored by Stewart Copeland
1990s American films